Foxdale Station (Manx: Stashoon Forsdal) was the southern terminus of the Foxdale Railway in the Isle of Man.

History
The station was established by the railway as its southern extent, built primarily to serve the lead ore industry which at the time of the line's arrival had thrived for many years but was in decline; the railway never met the expectations of its backers which were largely formed from the directorships of the Manx Northern Railway.  A limited passenger service was provided from 1886 for which a solitary carriage was provided.  This became known as Kitto's Coach (being named after the mines' captain who had insisted upon its provision) and later simply the Foxdale Coach.  This item of stock survives today and was restored to 1887 condition in 2013 by the railway.  The station featured the only diamond-type "scissor" crossing on the island's railway network, which is believed still to be in situ today, buried beneath the mines' spoils to the rear of the station building.  The mining industry collapsed in the village and the line was closed in 1940 although the rails remained in place for many years and it is believed that stock workings to this station took place as late as 1960.  Today the station building survives and is used as a heritage centre, having previously seen use as a community centre and, prior to this, as the headquarters of the Manx Flux & Mica Co., for several years after the railway had closed.

Route

See also
 Isle of Man Railway stations
 Foxdale
 Foxdale Mines

References

Railway stations in the Isle of Man
Railway stations opened in 1886
Railway stations closed in 1940